Kaohsiung Medical University Chung-Ho Memorial Hospital, also known as Kaohsiung Medical University Hospital, is a teaching hospital in Sanmin District, Kaohsiung, Taiwan. It was established on 16 June 1957 to provide clinical training, health care and medical treatment, and facilitate medical research and development. It is the teaching hospital for Kaohsiung Medical University.

Kaohsiung Medical University Chung-Ho Memorial Hospital is located at the corner of  Tzyou 1st Road and Zi-You 1st Street and consists of 1626 beds and 12 departments. A pioneer hospital in Southern Taiwan, it offers general medical care as well as a wide range of highly specialized services and innovative care. KMU Chung-Ho Memorial Hospital is a part of the Kaohsiung Medical University Medical Center network of teaching hospitals associated with the Kaohsiung Medical University. KMU Chung-Ho Memorial Hospital was designated by the Taiwan government a High Quality Cancer Therapy Center in 2010.

The mission of the hospital is to:
 Teach — Provide Medical Education & Student Practice
 Research — Provide Medical / Relative Subject Research & Development
 Serve — Provide Disease Diagnose / Treatment & Health maintenance

See also
 List of hospitals in Taiwan

External links 
 Kaohsiung Municipal Hsiao-Kang Hospital Webpage

1957 establishments in Taiwan
Hospital buildings completed in 1957
Teaching hospitals in Taiwan
Hospitals established in 1957
Hospitals in Kaohsiung
Kaohsiung Medical University